11β-Hydroxysteroid dehydrogenase type 1, also known as cortisone reductase, is an NADPH-dependent enzyme highly expressed in key metabolic tissues including liver, adipose tissue, and the central nervous system. In these tissues, HSD11B1 reduces cortisone to the active hormone cortisol that activates glucocorticoid receptors. It belongs to the family of short-chain dehydrogenases. It is encoded by the  gene.

Function 
The protein encoded by this gene is a microsomal enzyme that catalyzes the conversion of the stress hormone cortisol to the inactive metabolite cortisone. In addition, the encoded protein can catalyze the reverse reaction, the conversion of cortisone to cortisol. Too much cortisol can lead to central obesity, and a particular variation in this gene has been associated with obesity and insulin resistance in children. Two transcript variants encoding the same protein have been found for this gene.

Clinical significance 
11β-HSD1 is inhibited by carbenoxolone, a drug typically used in the treatment of peptic ulcers. Moreover, 18alpha-glycyrrhizic acid from the root of glycyrrhiza glabra was discovered as an inhibitor.

Salicylate downregulates 11β-HSD1 expression in adipose tissue in obese mice and hence may explain why aspirin improves glycemic control in type 2 diabetes. Epigallocatechin gallate from green tea can also potently inhibit this enzyme; green tea is a complex mixture of various phenolics with contents varying with production and processing, and some of the phenolics are known HDAC inhibitors that alter genetic expression.  EGCG as usually consumed in green tea is poorly absorbed into the bloodstream. More research is needed to reach firm conclusions.

See also 
 Cortisone reductase deficiency
 11β-hydroxysteroid dehydrogenase type 2

References

External links

Further reading 

 
 
 
 
 
 
 
 
 
 
 
 
 
 
 
 
 
 

EC 1.1.1
Human proteins